The Laurentian Fan or Laurentian Abyss is an underwater depression off the eastern coast of Canada in the Atlantic Ocean. Not a trench, but more of an "underwater valley", it is estimated to be at most ~19,685 feet (3.7 miles; 6.0 km) in depth. The Laurentian Fan is a product of glaciation and water currents from the Gulf of Saint Lawrence. It is part of the Laurentian cone region, bound by the Laurentian Channel and the Sohm Abyssal Plain.

Towards the end of the 1980s, it was discovered unexpectedly that the fan is the site of hydrothermal vents with their own ecosystems functioning in the absence of sunlight. These supported organisms such as vesicomyid and thyasirid clams, as well as marine gastropods and other epifauna similar to those found in hydrothermal and cold seep environments elsewhere.

The Laurentian Fan plays a geographic role in the plotline of the 1990 film The Hunt for Red October. It also appears at the end of the 2007 film Transformers, with the United States government depicted dumping the remains of the defeated Decepticons into the fan, in hopes that the crushing depths and low temperature will destroy the remains. The fan later reappears in the film's 2009 sequel Transformers: Revenge of the Fallen.

See also
 Abyssal plain

References
Notes

External links

Landforms of the Atlantic Ocean
Oceanography of Canada